Janet Souto-Garcia (born 22 November 1967) is a former professional tennis player from Spain.

Biography
Souto, who comes from Galicia but is Venezuelan by birth, began playing on the professional tour in the late 1980s. 

Often partnering her sister Ninoska, the pair made the doubles semi-finals of the 1988 Spanish Open.

In 1992 she featured in the main draw of the women's doubles at three grand slam tournaments, all with Ana Segura as her partner. She also featured in the 1994 US Open, partnering Ruxandra Dragomir.

ITF finals

Singles (1–0)

Doubles (11–10)

References

External links
 
 

1967 births
Living people
Spanish female tennis players
Venezuelan emigrants to Spain
Sportspeople from Galicia (Spain)
Spanish people of Venezuelan descent
Tennis players from Caracas
20th-century Spanish women